List of presidents of the National Assembly of Mauritania

Below is a list of office-holders:

Sources 

https://www.assembleenationale.mr/assemblee-nationale-elu-en-octobre-1946/

Mauritania politics-related lists
Mauritania, National Assembly